Santa Cruz Valley Union High School is a high school in Eloy, Arizona. It is the only school under the jurisdiction of the Santa Cruz Valley Union High School District.

Notable alumni
 Art Malone and Benny Malone, football players for Arizona State University and in the NFL

References

Public high schools in Arizona
Schools in Pinal County, Arizona
Eloy, Arizona